Highett railway station is located on the Frankston line in Victoria, Australia. It serves the south-eastern Melbourne suburb of Highett, and opened on 19 December 1881 as Highett Road. It was renamed Highett on 14 December 1885.

History
Highett station opened when the railway line from Caulfield was extended to Mordialloc. Like the suburb itself, the station was named after William Highett, a local landowner and a member of the Victorian Legislative Council.

The station was built with the endorsement of Victorian Premier Thomas Bent, who ordered the railway line be redirected through Highett, and also demanded a higher standard of departmental residences there than elsewhere. The current station building was erected in 1883 and 1884, and was refurbished in 1966. It was refurbished again in 1986, after it had been damaged by fire during the previous year.

In 1925, a railway parcels van hit a car at the nearby Wickham Road level crossing, killing eight people in the car. The gatekeeper was found not guilty of a charge of manslaughter, the jury finding the incident was due to the fault of the system, and not human negligence. In 1932, there was a shootout between a policeman and a burglar, who was killed.

In 1973, a former wood yard and a lamp room were demolished.

In 1985, boom barriers replaced interlocked gates at the Highett Road level crossing, located at the down end of the station. The signal box for the level crossing was also abolished during that time.

On 4 May 2010, as part of the 2010/2011 State Budget, $83.7 million was allocated to upgrade Highett to a Premium Station, along with nineteen others. However, in March 2011, that was scrapped by the Baillieu Government.

In 2014, the Victorian State Government launched a public safety initiative which involved Protective Services Officers (PSOs) patrolling railway stations at certain times of the day. On 1 June of that year, Highett was added to the list of patrolled stations.  A PSO 'pod' to provide an office and holding cell was also added to the station.

In October 2017, two PSOs patrolling the station were shot at by a disgruntled 22-year-old, using a battery-powered mechanical handgun filled with gel pellets. One officer was struck in the temple, but was not seriously injured. The shooter, who fired from the balcony of an apartment overlooking the station, was arrested by police and charged with a variety of offences.

It was announced in October 2022 that Highett would be elevated as part of a project to remove seven level crossings on the line. Further details, designs and a construction timeline were to be released closer to the opening of the new station in 2029.

Platforms and services
Highett has two side platforms. It is served by Frankston line trains.

Platform 1:
  all stations services to Flinders Street, Werribee and Williamstown

Platform 2:
  all stations services to Frankston

Transport links

Ventura Bus Lines operates two routes via Highett station, under contract to Public Transport Victoria:
 : Hampton station – Carrum station
 : Hampton station – Berwick station

Gallery

See also
 Southland railway station

References

External links

Railway stations in Melbourne
Railway stations in Australia opened in 1881
Railway stations in the City of Kingston (Victoria)
Railway stations in the City of Bayside